Intelligencer is an archaic word for a person who gathers intelligence, like a spy or secret agent. The term may refer to:

Newspapers
 Daily Intelligencer (disambiguation), multiple papers
 Edwardsville Intelligencer (1862–present) Edwardsville, Illinois, US
 Illinois Intelligencer (1814–1832), earlier the Western Intelligencer, Kaskaskia and Vandalia, Illinois, US
 Intelligencer Journal (1794–present) Lancaster, Pennsylvania, US
 National Intelligencer (1800–1867) Washington, D.C., US
 Seattle Post-Intelligencer (1863–present) Seattle, Washington, US
 The Intelligencer, early name of The Advocate (Stamford) (1829–present) Stamford, Connecticut, US
 The Intelligencer and Wheeling News Register (1859–present) Wheeling, West Virginia, US
 The Pennsylvania Intelligencer, early name of The Patriot-News (1820–present) Harrisburg, Pennsylvania, US
 The Intelligencer (Doylestown, Pennsylvania) (1804–present) Doylestown, Pennsylvania, US
 The Intelligencer (Belleville), Belleville, Ontario, Canada

Magazines
 The English Intelligencer (1966–1968) poetry newsletter, UK
 The Mathematical Intelligencer (1979–present) New York, US
 Intelligencer (website), a website within New York magazine

Other uses
 Informant 
 Transatlantic Intelligencer

See also
The Intelligencer (disambiguation)